Glyphesis is a genus of  dwarf spiders that was first described by Eugène Louis Simon in 1926.

Species
 it contains seven species, found in Canada, Denmark, Germany, Hungary, Japan, Poland, Russia, Slovakia, Ukraine, and the United States:
Glyphesis asiaticus Eskov, 1989 – Russia (Middle Siberia to Far East)
Glyphesis cottonae (La Touche, 1946) – Europe, Russia (Europe to West Siberia), Japan
Glyphesis idahoanus (Chamberlin, 1949) – USA
Glyphesis nemoralis Esyunin & Efimik, 1994 – Ukraine, Russia (Europe)
Glyphesis scopulifer (Emerton, 1882) – USA, Canada
Glyphesis servulus (Simon, 1881) (type) – Europe
Glyphesis taoplesius Wunderlich, 1969 – Denmark, Germany, Poland, Slovakia, Hungary, Russia (Europe)

See also
 List of Linyphiidae species (A–H)

References

Araneomorphae genera
Linyphiidae
Spiders of North America